Tribhuvan University International Cricket Ground, commonly known as TU Cricket Ground or simply TU Ground is a cricket ground in Tribhuvan University, Kirtipur, Nepal.

History

The first recorded match held on the ground came in 1998 when Bangladesh played Papua New Guinea in the 1998 ACC Trophy.

Nepal took part in the inaugural Intercontinental Cup with the matches in the competition having first-class status.  The ground held its first first-class match when Nepal hosted Malaysia.  Another two first-class matches  were held there during the 2005 Intercontinental Cup when Nepal hosted Hong Kong and the United Arab Emirates.

These were the first first-class matches to be held anywhere in Nepal.  The ground has since hosted a number of international competitions, including the 2010 ICC World Cricket League Division Five and 2015-17 ICC World Cricket League Championship.

Controversy arose during the competition in a match between Nepal and the United States with crowd trouble flaring up when a large number of spectators disturbed play when they became unhappy with the performance of the Nepal team.

The match was later investigated by the International Cricket Council for the crowd trouble and the resulting calculations of the net-run rate which denied Singapore promotion to 2010 ICC World Cricket League Division Four.

The ground has also successfully hosted domestic tournaments such as Everest Premier League, Prime Minister One Day Cup and so on with a lot of people coming to watch the matches and enjoying domestic cricket.

Renovations
After the devastating 2015 Nepal Earthquake, the basic infrastructures of the ground were destroyed. Thus, the CAN rebuilt its infrastructures and added more facilities such as the addition of ground walls, a pavilion building, media box, view tower and VIP Seating Area.

Major sports events

 1998 ACC Trophy
 2005 Intercontinental Cup
 2010 ICC World Cricket League Division Five
 2011 ACC Twenty20 Cup
 2013 ACC Twenty20 Cup
 2015–17 ICC World Cricket League Championship 
 2016 Everest Premier League
 2017 Everest Premier League
 2018 Everest Premier League
 Cricket at the 2019 South Asian Games – Men's tournament
 2019-22 ICC Cricket World Cup League 2
 2021–22 Nepal T20I Tri-Nation Series

Records

ODI records 

 Highest ODI total: 310/6 – United Arab Emirates vs. Nepal , 2023 Nepal Tri-Nation Series (round 21), 16 March 2023
 Highest Individual ODI Score: 133 – Michael van Lingen, Namibia vs. Nepal, 2023 Nepal Tri-Nation Series (round 19), 14 February 2023
 Best ODI Bowling Figure: 6/16 – Sandeep Lamichhane, Nepal vs United States, 2020 Nepal Tri-Nation Series, 12 February 2020
 Highest ODI Partnership: 216 (for the 3rd wicket) – Aqib Ilyas & Zeeshan Maqsood, Oman vs. United States, 2020 Nepal Tri-Nation Series, 11 February 2020

T20I records 

 Highest T20I total: 238/3 – Nepal vs. Netherlands, 2021 Nepal Tri-Nation Series, 24 April 2021
 Highest Individual T20I Score: 133* –  Max O'Dowd, Netherlands vs. Malaysia, 2021 Nepal Tri-Nation Series, 18 April 2021
 Best T20I Bowling Figure: 5/21 – Karan KC, Nepal vs. PNG, 2021-22 Nepal T20I Tri-Nation Series, 28 March 2022 
 Highest T20I Partnership: 137* (for the 3rd wicket) – Tony Ura & Asad Vala, PNG vs. Malaysia, 2021-22 Nepal T20I Tri-Nation Series, 1 April 2022

List of International centuries

ODI centuries 
Twelve ODI centuries have been scored at the venue.

T20I centuries 
Three T20I centuries have been scored at the venue.

List of International five-wicket hauls

One-day Internationals 
The following table summarizes the five-wicket hauls taken in ODIs at this venue.

Twenty20 Internationals 
The following table summarizes the five-wicket hauls taken in T20Is at this venue.

References

External links

Tribhuvan University International Cricket Ground at ESPNcricinfo
Tribhuvan University International Cricket Ground at CricketArchive

Cricket grounds in Nepal
Tribhuvan University
Sports venues in Kathmandu
1998 establishments in Nepal
Sports venues completed in 1998